Achlya hoerburgeri is a moth in the family Drepanidae. It was described by Schawerda in 1924. It is found in the Russian Far East. The habitat consists of mixed and broad-leaved forests with oak.

References

Moths described in 1924
Thyatirinae
Moths of Asia